Ericrocis is a genus of bees in the family Apidae. There are at least four described species in Ericrocis.

Species
These four species belong to the genus Ericrocis:
 Ericrocis arizonensis Baker
 Ericrocis lata (Cresson, 1878)
 Ericrocis melectoides Baker
 Ericrocis pintada Snelling & Zavortink, 1984

References

External links

 

Apinae
Articles created by Qbugbot